The Botswana Cricket Association (BCA) is the official governing body of the sport of cricket in Botswana. Its headquarters is in Gaborone, Botswana. It is affiliated with Botswana National Sports Council  (BNSC) and the Botswana National Olympic Committee (BNOC). Established in 1979, the BCA has been a member of the International Cricket Council (ICC) since 2002, and was also a founding member of the Africa Cricket Association.

History

The earliest cricketing history which can be substantiated relates to a paragraph contained in the publication "The White Tide" by David Sinclair, Modern Press, Gweru 2000 wherein it is recorded that a cricket match was played in the late 1870s in a village named Shoshong between "Home-Born" and the "Colonials". The game was started in the main by expatriates from Britain, South Africa, India, Pakistan and Sri-Lanka who were on various assignments in the country soon after independence in September 1966. The game was initially played in the two main centres viz Gaborone and Francistown. However, with the discovery of diamonds on 1 March 1967 at Orapa. The Botswana Cricket Association was founded on 8 February 1983.

See also
 Botswana national cricket team

References

External links
Official website
Cricinfo-Botswana

Cricket administration
Cricket in Botswana
Cricket
1979 establishments in Botswana
Sports organizations established in 1979